Prafulla Kar (16 February 1939 – 17 April 2022) was an Odia musician, singer, lyricist, writer and columnist.
He received Padma Shri, the fourth highest civilian award by the Government of India in 2015 for his contribution in the field of arts.

Early life and career
Born in 1939 into musician family in Puri, Orissa Province. His father is Baidyanath Kar and mother is Susila Kar. His uncle Khetra Mohan Kar was a tabla player. He was raised and brought up by his grandfather Bhagaban Misra and grandmother Apanna Devi because he lost his father at an early age. when student he was a part of AISF ( students wing of CPI) and as an artist he was an eminent part of IPTA , the cultural wing of CPI.

Prafulla Kar has worked as music director and often as singer in 70 Odia Films (Released and unreleased) as well as in 4 Bangla films.

In popular culture
 'Prafulla Kar Samman' awarded to different singers every year to celebrate his birthday in a two-day musical event. The award consists of a cash reward of Rs 1 lakh, a citation and a shawl.

Awards

References

External links
 
 Biography
 

1939 births
2022 deaths
People from Puri
Indian film score composers
Indian male playback singers
Recipients of the Padma Shri in arts
Indian male film score composers